The following are the members of the Dewan Undangan Negeri or state assemblies, elected in the 1982 state election and by-elections. Also included is the list of the Sabah and Sarawak state assembly members who were elected in 1985 and 1983 respectively.

Perlis

Kedah

Kelantan

Trengganu

Penang

Perak

Pahang

Selangor

Negri Sembilan

Malacca

Johore

Sabah

1985–1986

Sarawak

1983–1987

Notes

References

Abdullah, Z. G., Adnan, H. N., & Lee, K. H. (1997). Malaysia, tokoh dulu dan kini = Malaysian personalities, past and present. Kuala Lumpur, Malaysia: Penerbit Universiti Malaya.
Anzagain Sdn. Bhd. (2004). Almanak keputusan pilihan raya umum: Parlimen & Dewan Undangan Negeri, 1959-1999. Shah Alam, Selangor: Anzagain. 
Chin, U.-H. (1996). Chinese politics in Sarawak: A study of the Sarawak United People's Party. Kuala Lumpur: Oxford University Press.
Crouch, H. (1982). Malaysia's 1982 General Election. Institute of Southeast Asian Studies.
Dewan Bahasa dan Pustaka. (1982). Dewan masyarakat, Volume 20. Selangor Darul Ehsan, etc.: Media Network Sdn. Bhd., etc.
Faisal, S. H. (2012). Domination and Contestation: Muslim Bumiputera Politics in Sarawak. Institute of Southeast Asian Studies.
Hussain, M. (1987). Membangun demokrasi: Pilihanraya di Malaysia. Kuala Lumpur: Karya Bistari.
Ibnu, H. (1993). PAS kuasai Malaysia?: 1950-2000 sejarah kebangkitan dan masa depan. Kuala Lumpur: GG Edar.

1982 elections in Malaysia